The Waterloo Diamonds was a baseball team located in Waterloo, Iowa that formed in 1989 and lasted until 1993. A member of the Midwest League, they were affiliated with two teams in 1989-the Baltimore Orioles and San Diego Padres and the franchise was a descendant of the Waterloo Hawks . From 1990 to 1993, they were affiliated solely with the Padres. Their stadium was Riverfront Stadium.

Year-by-year record

Defunct Midwest League teams
Baseball teams established in 1989
Waterloo, Iowa
Professional baseball teams in Iowa
Baltimore Orioles minor league affiliates
San Diego Padres minor league affiliates
1989 establishments in Iowa
1993 disestablishments in Iowa
Defunct baseball teams in Iowa